Bastards is the third remix album by Icelandic artist Björk, it was released on 19 November 2012. The album features remixes of tracks from her eighth studio album, Biophilia (2011). All of the remixes were previously released on The Crystalline Series or the Biophilia Remix Series, and they were all remastered by Mandy Parnell.

Background
Although all tracks had already been released, Björk "felt it important to gather together the essence of the remixes" so she "picked a quarter of them for one CD for people who are perhaps not too sassy [sic] downloaders or don't have the time or energy to partake in the hunter-gathering rituals of the internet". The cover features the 'strata' persona Björk adopted for the "Mutual Core" music video which was directed by Andrew Thomas Huang.

Track listing

Sample credits
 "Mutual Core" (These New Puritans Remix featuring Solomon Islands Song) includes samples from the traditional composition "Funeral Song (Solomon Islands 1978)", as extracted from the album Spirit of Melanesia by David Fanshawe.

Charts

References

2012 remix albums
Björk remix albums
One Little Independent Records albums
Polydor Records albums
Albums produced by Hudson Mohawke
Albums produced by Mark Bell (British musician)
Albums produced by Björk